Abbiamo vinto! is a 1951 Italian comedy film directed by Robert A. Stemmle starring Paolo Stoppa.

Cast
Paolo Stoppa as Augusto Fabriano 
Camillo Pilotto as  Pasquale Nardecchi 
Walter Chiari as  Giorgio Silvestri 
Antonella Lualdi as  Elsa Nardecchi 
Margherita Bagni as  Amalia Nardecchi 
Jacqueline Pierreux as  Iris 
Sergio Tofano as  Temistocle Leoni 
Lilla Brignone as  Giulia Casadei 
Anna Maria Bottini as  Maria Bianchi

External links 
 

1951 films
1950s Italian-language films
Italian black-and-white films
Films directed by Robert A. Stemmle
1951 comedy films
Italian comedy films
Films with screenplays by Mario Amendola
1950s Italian films